Jens Kristiansen (born 25 May 1952) is a Danish chess player. He earned the FIDE title of Grandmaster (GM) in 2012 by winning the World Seniors Chess Championship, prior to which he had been an International Master (IM) since 1979.

Born in Copenhagen, Kristiansen is a three-time national Danish champion (1979, 1982 and 1995) and he has represented his native country four times at the Chess Olympiads between 1978 and 1990. In 2013, Kristiansen shared first place with Anatoly Vaisser in the 2013 World Seniors Championship, taking the silver medal on tiebreak score.

FIDE ratings

References

External links
 
 
 

1952 births
Living people
Danish chess players
Chess grandmasters
Chess Olympiad competitors
World Senior Chess Champions